In Little Italy is a 1909 American short silent drama film directed by D. W. Griffith.

Plot
Marie has two lovely men pretending her, she decided to reject Tony and accept Victor as her new sweetheart. Tony, frustrated and jealous for Marie's decision stabs Victor,  but later he discovers that Victor was still alive and decided to break into Marie's house where Victor is convalescing to finish the job.

Cast

 Marion Leonard - Marie Cadrone
 George Nichols - Tony Guiletto
 Henry B. Walthall - Victor
 Charles Arling	
 Kate Bruce - At the Ball
 William J. Butler - In Bar
 Charles Craig - At the Ball
 Adele DeGarde
 Gladys Egan - One of the Children
 Frank Evans - Sheriff's Deputy
 Ruth Hart - At the Ball
 Guy Hedlund - At the Ball (unconfirmed)
 James Kirkwood - Sheriff
 Henry Lehrman - At the Ball
 Stephanie Longfellow - At the Ball (unconfirmed)
 Jeanie MacPherson - At the Ball
 W. Chrystie Miller - In Bar
 Owen Moore - At the Ball
 Anthony O'Sullivan - A peddlar
 Billy Quirk - At the Ball
 Gertrude Robinson - At the Ball
 Mack Sennett - In Bar / At the Ball
 Marion Sunshine
 Blanche Sweet - At the Ball
 J. Waltham - In Bar
 Dorothy West - At the Ball

See also
 D. W. Griffith filmography
 Blanche Sweet filmography

References

External links

1909 films
American silent short films
Biograph Company films
American black-and-white films
1909 drama films
Films directed by D. W. Griffith
1909 short films
Silent American drama films
Films with screenplays by Frank E. Woods
1900s American films